Miromusic is an electronic music partnership of Mads Arp and Steen Thottrup of Denmark.

Origins
Miro was founded in Farum, Denmark in 1990 and released their first record Energy / Mystery on Coma Records in 1991.

Their international breakthrough came when they both moved to London and released Pure Silk on Effective Records. 
Pure Silk reached number 78 in the UK Chart, number 17 on the official dance chart and Pete Tong's "Essential New Tune" on his BBC Radio 1.
Miro has performed live at the Ministry of Sound, Pumpehuset and many raves.

Their track Spaceman has been released 3 times, Effective Records and Dance Opera, Benelux (twice).

Miro have released 2 tracks on legendary UK label Hooj Choons, named "Paradise" and "By Your Side" both appearing on Global Underground compilations.

Miro's Vocal 7-inch version of Greece 2000, Three Drives, peaked at No. 12 in the official UK Top 40 chart.

Chill out
Miro made their first Café del Mar appearance in 1996 on Volume 3 with their track "Emotions of Paradise", compiled by the legendary Ibiza based ambient DJ José Padilla. The track has later been voted the fifth-best ambient track ever by Café del Mar resident, DJ Bruno Lepetre, and has been licensed to more than 30 ambient albums around the world.

Miromusic has appeared on more than 10 Cafe del Mar albums to date.
In 2002 Miro made a chill out remix for Virgin Records of Tiësto's Battleship Grey featuring Kirsty Hawkshaw (OPUSIII)

Miro released the album 'Remote - Opening Doors' in 2004 with Roger Eno.

Discography 
Live it Now (Okyo Recordings 2006)
Freeze the moment (Greyhound music / Traveller 2005)
Holding On (Cafe del Mar Volume 11 2004)
By your side (Euphonic Records 2003)
The one I run to (Skyline Records 2003)
Spaceman v3 (Greyhound Music / Traveller 2002)
By your side (original mix) (Lost Language / Hooj Choons 2002)
The Cure (The Sunshine mix) (Cafe del Mar Volume 9 2002)
By your side (Markus Schulz mix/ Ian Wilkie mix/ Miro's rolled mix) (Lost Language / Hooj Choons 2002)
Paradise (Hooj Choons 1999)
Orient Express (Dance Opera, NL 1997)
Emotions of Paradise (Cafe del Mar Volume 3 1996)
Spaceman v2 (Dance Opera 1996)
Metropolis (Paige Pressing / Effective Records 1995)
Spaceman (Effective Records 1994)
Tour de Trance (Outloud Records 1994)
Celebrate (Effective Records 1994)
Pure Silk / El Salvador (Effective Records 1993)
Cocoon (Coma Records 1992)
Energy / Mystery (Coma Records 1991)

Recording guises 
 Miro, Colours, Remote, Orange
 Mads Arp: Raoul Express (Miss Moneypennys & MP2/Multiply), Arpiction (Soundpiercing — Armada) Mads Arp (Black Hole & Cafe del Mar).
 Steen Thottrup: Professional Losers (Southern Fried), Conamore (Big Star), Twotrups (Hope) and Steen Thottrup (Cafe del Mar).

External links 
Miromusic website
Miromusic on Myspace
Miromusic on Discogs

Danish record producers
Danish electronic music groups